Achnanthaceae is a family of algae belonging to the order Achnanthales.

Genera:
 Achnanthes Bory, 1822
 Amphicocconeis M.De Stephano & D.Marino, 2002
 Diatomella
 Haloroundia C.A.Düaz & N.I.Maidana, 2006
 Platebaikalia Kulikovskiy, Glushchenko, Genkal & Kociolek, 2020
 Platessa H.Lange-Bertalot, 2004

References

Algae